Rugile Rulyte (born 7 July 2002) is a Lithuanian-born Norwegian football goalkeeper who plays for Rosenborg.

Her family migrated to Norway when she was 10 years old, settling in Leksvik. She took up football, became a youth international and then a junior team player for Trondheims-Ørn, which changed its name to Rosenborg in 2020. Still under 20 of age, Rulyte was backup to Kristine Nøstmo in the 2020 and 2021. Nøstmo had previously retired from international play, and in the fall of 2021 Nøstmo announced her intention to retire altogether, opening for Rulyte as the new first-choice.

After only a few youth international games, Rulyte received her first call-up for Norway in August 2021. She started her first match in November 2021 against Armenia. In doing so, she became the first immigrant to feature for Norway in 12 years, the last one was Nasra Abdullah against Sweden in 2009.

References

2002 births
Living people
Lithuanian emigrants to Norway
People from Leksvik
Norwegian women's footballers
Norway women's youth international footballers
Norway women's international footballers
Rosenborg BK Kvinner players
Toppserien players
Women's association football goalkeepers